Anna Vladislavovna Linnikova (born 4 April 2000) is a Russian model and beauty pageant titleholder who was crowned Miss Russia 2022. As Miss Russia, Linnikova will represent Russia at Miss Universe 2022 and Miss World 2023.

Early life and education
Linnikova was raised in Orenburg, and began working professionally as a model at age 16. As a professional model, Linnikova has worked under contract in countries such as China, Japan, South Korea, Vietnam, and Malaysia. 
She later moved to Saint Petersburg to attend the Saint Petersburg University of Management Technologies and Economics. Prior to winning Miss Russia 2022, Linnikova was in her second year of university, studying public relations.

Pageantry
Linnikova began her career in pageantry in 2022, after being one of 750,000 women throughout Russia to audition to be a finalist in Miss Russia 2022. She was ultimately selected as an official candidate, representing Orenburg. Linnikova advanced to the top ten in the final held on 25 July 2022, before being declared the winner. As Miss Russia, Linnikova officially represented Russia at Miss Universe 2022 and will compete at Miss World 2023.

References

External links 

2000 births
Living people
Miss Russia winners
Miss Universe 2022 contestants
Miss World 2022 delegates
People from Orenburg
Russian beauty pageant winners
Russian female models